The Town School - a coeducational, independent school based in New York City, founded in 1913
Town School for Boys - an independent school based in San Francisco, founded in 1939